Gusići may refer to:

 Gusići, Bosnia and Herzegovina, a village near Goražde
 Gusić family, one of the medieval Croatian noble families